Mayfield Township may refer to:

 Mayfield Township, DeKalb County, Illinois
 Mayfield Township, Grand Traverse County, Michigan
 Mayfield Township, Lapeer County, Michigan
 Mayfield Township, Pennington County, Minnesota
 Mayfield Township, Hall County, Nebraska
 Mayfield Township, Cuyahoga County, Ohio
 Mayfield Township, Yankton County, South Dakota in Yankton County, South Dakota

Township name disambiguation pages